A total solar eclipse occurred at the Moon's ascending node of the orbit on June 11, 1983. A solar eclipse occurs when the Moon passes between Earth and the Sun, thereby totally or partly obscuring the image of the Sun for a viewer on Earth. A total solar eclipse occurs when the Moon's apparent diameter is larger than the Sun's, blocking all direct sunlight, turning day into darkness. Totality occurs in a narrow path across Earth's surface, with the partial solar eclipse visible over a surrounding region thousands of kilometres wide. Occurring only 48 hours before perigee (Perigee on June 13, 1983), the Moon's apparent diameter was larger.

The path of totality went through Christmas Islands, Indonesia, Papua New Guinea, and terminated in Vanuatu. Maximum eclipse occurred off the Indonesian island of Madura. Major Indonesian cities witnessed totality, including Yogyakarta, Semarang, Surabaya, and Makassar, in addition to Port Moresby in Papua New Guinea.

Restrictions of observation 
To avoid blindness, then president of Indonesia Soeharto prohibited local people from observing the eclipse directly through then Information Minister Harmoko, only allowing foreigners to observe from faraway places. Besides the requirements of closing and draping over all windows and airshafts, children were asked to hide themselves in cupboards and below desks as the eclipsing sun's rays were said to be more dangerous to children than to adults. They were allowed to watch a live broadcast of the eclipse occurring over Borobudur Temple in Magelang, Central Java, on state-owned TV channel TVRI. Because of the difference in restriction's intensity between regions, some locals did observe it.

Observation 
The Chinese Eclipse Observation Team formed by Beijing Astronomical Observatory (now incorporated into the National Astronomical Observatories of China), Purple Mountain Observatory and Nanjing Astronomical Instrument Factory conducted observation in Port Moresby. Observation in Port Moresby was successful due to the cloudless weather during the eclipse, compared with the cloudy weather in Yogyakarta where teams from many countries went. The Chinese team did spectrum observations of the chromosphere and corona, the broadband corona luminosity and polarization, and the coloured photography of the whole eclipse process.

Related eclipses

Eclipses in 1983 
 A total solar eclipse at the Moon's ascending node of the orbit on Saturday, June 11th, 1983.
 A partial lunar eclipse at the Moon's descending node of the orbit on Saturday, June 25th, 1983.
 An annular solar eclipse at the Moon's descending node of the orbit on Sunday, December 04th, 1983.
 A penumbral lunar eclipse at the Moon's ascending node of the orbit on Tuesday, December 20th, 1983.

Solar eclipses of 1982–1985

Saros 127

Metonic series

Inex series

Notes

References

Photos:
Prof. Druckmüller's eclipse photography site
Solar Corona Shape
 The 1983 Eclipse in Java

1983 06 11
1983 in science
1983 06 11
June 1983 events
1983 in Indonesia
1983 in Papua New Guinea